The Sanjiangyuan, is an area of the Tibetan Plateau in Qinghai province, China which contains the headwaters of three great rivers of Asia: the Yellow, the Yangtze, and the Mekong. Parts of the area were protected as the Sanjiangyuan National Nature Reserve (SNNR), also called the Three Rivers Nature Reserve. The reserve consisted of 18 subareas, and each contained three zones which were managed with differing degrees of strictness. In 2015, the Chinese government decided to implement a new national park system, and created Sanjiangyuan National Park, which is set to open officially in 2020.

Along with wetland and waters protection, other ecological values, such as grassland, forest, and wildlife enhancement, have also been presented as goals. To advance the goals of the SNNR uncontrolled or poorly managed mining, logging, hunting, and grazing have been curtailed. Foreign and other mining firms have replaced the uncontrolled miners, trees have been planted, and measures have been taken to protect endangered species. To protect the grasslands, pastoralists are not permitted to graze their animals in designated ‘core zones’ (see below), and grazing is supervised elsewhere in the SNNR. In addition, residents have been resettled from core zones and other grassland areas of the SNNR, and rangeland has been fenced and is in the process of being privatized throughout the Sanjiangyuan Area.

Sanjiangyuan Area 

The Sanjiangyuan Area covers the southern and eastern parts of Qinghai and has an area of about 363,000 km2, 50.4% of Qinghai. Included in it wholly or partially are 18 counties of the four Tibetan Autonomous Prefectures Yushu, Guoluo, Hainan, and Huangnan, and Haixi Mongol and Tibetan Autonomous Prefecture. The Sanjiangyuan Area’s population is about 600,000, 90% of which are Tibetan. 70% of the Sanjiangyuan Area’s population are considered to be ‘impoverished’, with the average income of about 2000 RMB (roughly $300) per person/year. Since animal husbandry is the primary source of income, and many people are nomadic, this figure does not reflect the actual standard of living in a largely non-cash economy. The Sanjiangyuan Area in general has no special legal status, and the term is used to  indicate the region in which the three rivers arise, and the Sanjiangyuan National Park exists.

The Sanjiangyuan National Nature Reserve (SNNR) was a subarea of the Sanjiangyuan Area which covered an area of about 152,300 km2, 21% of Qinghai, 42% of the Sanjiangyuan Area. It was larger than England and Wales combined. About 200,000 people traditionally live within the area that was covered by the SNNR. Resettlement efforts were made to resettle all nomads in Qinghai by 2011, but it is unclear as to the outcome of those efforts. The State Forestry Administration and the Qinghai government legally established the SNNR in May 2000. Its Management Bureau was founded September 2001, and the SNNR obtained State-level (national) status January 2003. The Management Bureau is in Xining, and is under the Qinghai Forest Bureau. Mr. Wang Zhibao, Director of the State Forest Administration, has said the goals of the nature reserve protect the Qinghai-Tibet Plateau ecosystem, with a focus on alpine swamp meadow and the natural habitat of wildlife in the Sanjiangyuan Area.

The SNNR consisted of 18 subareas. These are of three types: wetland conservation (8 subareas), wildlife conservation (3 subareas), and shrubland or forest conservation (7 subareas). Each SNNR subarea had three zones: a core zone; a buffer zone; and a multiple-use experimental zone. Residents from degraded areas are being resettled. The core zone was supposed to be strictly managed with no grazing and measures to protect endangered species. All development and use were prohibited. It was a ‘no man’s zone’, with all its residents resettled elsewhere. The buffer zone promoted conservation but allowed limited and rotational grazing. The multiple-use experimental zones were also be used for scientific investigations, eco-tourism, and other green industries.

The Sanjiangyuan National Park, as of 2019, consists of an area of 123,100 km2, which is only slightly smaller than England. It encompasses most of the southern half of Qinghai Province.

In this program there were three types of zones to address the problem of degraded pastures: zones in which grazing was permanently banned, zones in which grazing was to be banned for typically three to ten years, and zones which were seasonally closed to grazing or allowed seasonal rotational grazing. The implementation of four kinds of zones in Yushu and Guoluo prefectures also seem to provide a precedent, if these are not the SNNR map’s zones themselves described differently. The first two of these zones correspond to what is referred to on the SNNR map as the ‘core zone’, the third to the ‘buffer zone’, and the fourth to the ‘experimental zone’. In the third (i.e. buffer) zone there was to be a reduction in grazing or a ban on grazing for five or ten years, and in the fourth (i.e. experimental) zone there was to be rotational grazing to capacity.

Since the government also has a poverty reduction and a major project (e.g. dams) resettlement program, and plans to resettle all nomads by 2011, residents from the buffer and the experimental zones may be resettled under these programs rather than the ecological resettlement program.

The absolute and relative sizes, and the populations before resettlement, of the zones are:

The boundaries and characters of the zones are likely open to negotiation. For example, the Canadian mining company Inter-Citic’s Dachang gold prospect is in either a buffer or experimental zone (or both).

In addition, only the 3 functional subareas of the SNNR, those with protection stations, have definite boundaries. The other 15 subareas are more a plan for their final delineation. The three functional subareas are A'nimaqin, Suojia-Qumahe (2 stations, one in each Qumahe and Suojia), and Tongtian He.

Townships affected 

The SNNR is entirely in Qinghai. The following table lists the 71 townships which are wholly or partially in the SNNR.

Conservation subareas 

This table lists the names of the 18 conservation subareas and the counties they wholly or partially occupy.

Birds 
Tibetan snowcock, Tibetan partridge, mute swan, greylag goose, bar-headed goose, ruddy shelduck, mallard, Eastern spot-billed duck, common teal, common pochard, common merganser, hoopoe, Pacific swift, little owl, hill pigeon, red collared dove, black-necked crane, Tibetan sandgrouse, Chinese monal, common redshank, green sandpiper, common sandpiper, ibisbill, little ringed plover, lesser sand plover, Pallas's gull, brown-headed gull, common tern, black kite, bearded vulture, Himalayan vulture, cinereous vulture, common buzzard, upland buzzard, steppe eagle, golden eagle, greater spotted eagle, eastern imperial eagle, Pallas fish eagle, common kestrel, merlin, saker falcon, peregrine falcon, great crested grebe, little egret, grey heron, black stork, ground tit, red-billed chough, common raven, Sichuan jay, white-throated dipper, black redstart, Hodgson's redstart, Daurian redstart, white-winged redstart, white-capped water redstart, common starling, wallcreeper, sand martin, Asian house martin, white-browed tit warbler, Tibetan lark, Oriental skylark, horned lark, house sparrow, Eurasian tree sparrow, white-winged snowfinch, Tibetan snowfinch, white-rumped snowfinch, rufous-necked snowfinch, plain-backed snowfinch, white wagtail, citrine wagtail, Richard's pipit, alpine accentor, robin accentor, brown accentor, twite, Brandt's mountain finch, common rosefinch, streaked rosefinch, great rosefinch, red-fronted rosefinch.

Mammals 

Himalayan wolf, red fox, Tibetan sand fox, Tibetan blue bear, European otter, Siberian weasel, Steppe polecat, European badger, Pallas cat, Amur leopard, Eurasian lynx, Snow leopard, Kiang, Alpine musk deer, wild yak, Chiru, Tibetan gazelle, Thorold's deer, blue sheep, argali, Himalayan marmot, Tibetan dwarf hamster, Plateau pika, large-eared pika, Glover's pika, woolly hare.

References

Further reading 
 Banks, T. et al. (May 2003), "Community Based Grasslands Management in Western China", Mountain Research and Development, Vol. 23, No. 2. 
 Banks, T. (2003), "Property Rights Reform in Rangeland China: Dilemmas On the Road to the Household Ranch", World Development, Vol. 31, No. 12.
 Foggin, J.M. (Feb. 2008), "Depopulating the Tibetan Grasslands", Mountain research and Development, Vol. 28, No. 1.
 Foggin, J.M. (2018), "Environmental conservation in the Tibetan Plateau region: lessons for China’s Belt and Road Initiative in the mountains of Central Asia", Land, Vol. 7, No. 2.
 Miller, J.D. (2007), "The World of Tibetan Nomads",  in "DROKPA:Nomads of the Tibetan Plateau and Himalaya", Vajra Publishers.
 Richard, C. et al. (2006), "The Paradox of the Individual Household Responsibility System in the Grasslands of the Tibetan Plateau", USDA Forest Service Proceedings.
 Worthy, F.R.  & Foggin, J.M., "From the Field (Fall 2008), Conflicts between local villagers and Tibetan brown bears in a remote region of the Tibetan Plateau", Human-Wildlife Conflicts 2(2).
 Yeh, E. (2003), "Tibet Range Wars: Spatial Politics and Authority on the Grasslands of Amdo",  Development and Change, 34(3).
 Smith A.T. and Foggin J.M. (1998), "Plateau Pika (Ochotona curzoniae) as keystone species to the alpine biodiversity of the Qinghai-Tibetan Plateau".
 Wu J., Wu G., Zheng T., Zhang X., Zhou K. (2020), "Value capture mechanisms, transaction costs, and heritage conservation: A case study of Sanjiangyuan National Park, China", Land Use Policy, Vol. 90:104246.

External links 
 Climate Change on the Tibetan Plateau, Asia Society
 Case Western Reserve University's Center for the Research on Tibet, a good source of downloadable articles about Tibetan nomads
 Information on Qinghai and the SNNR, Plateau Perspectives
 A Google Earth kmz file of the Sanjiangyuan Area, download from the World Database On Protected Areas

Geography of Qinghai
Nature reserves in China
Tourist attractions in Qinghai
Yushu Tibetan Autonomous Prefecture
Golog Tibetan Autonomous Prefecture
Yangtze River
Yellow River
Mekong River